Mario Cortiello (1 July 1907 – 23 December 1981) was an Italian painter. His work was part of the painting event in the art competition at the 1948 Summer Olympics.

References

1907 births
1981 deaths
20th-century Italian painters
Italian male painters
Olympic competitors in art competitions
Painters from Naples
20th-century Italian male artists